Eochondrosteus is a genus of extinct actinopterygian (ray-finned fish), comprising one species, E. sinensis (monotypy) from the Early Triassic strata in Gansu Province (Beishan Hills), China (previously interpreted as Permian in age). It is suggested to be the most basal acipenseriform (sturgeon, paddlefish, and their fossil relatives). It was originally described in 2005, and then redescribed in 2020 in Chinese. Other authors have considered the placement of Eochondrosteus within the Acipenseriformes as tentative.

References

Acipenseriformes
Prehistoric ray-finned fish genera
Triassic bony fish